The National Deaf Children's Society (NDCS) is a British charity dedicated to providing support, information and advice for deaf children and young people, their families and professionals working with them.

As a leading provider of impartial information and individual advocacy on every aspect of childhood deafness, the NDCS can help with welfare rights and benefit claims, making education choices, advising on health and audiology and technology, or simply as someone to talk to.

The Society campaigns for improvements in services aimed at families with deaf children, working with central and local government, health authorities, education professionals, social services, manufacturers and other voluntary organizations. Its headquarters are located in London, with regional offices in Birmingham, Belfast (NDCS Northern Ireland), Cardiff (NDCS Wales) and Glasgow (NDCS Scotland).

The Society has won an award for developing the first interactive CD-ROM—called the "Parent-to-Parent Guide"—aimed at helping parents of deaf children cope with the challenges of everyday life and has also won accolades in the British Medical Association Patient Information Awards 2017 for the information provided for families on its website.

Origins 
NDCS was founded as the Society of St John of Beverley and was renamed the Deaf Children's Society in 1945. It adopted its current name in the 1950s. At its established its objective was 'to further in every way possible the provision of full modern education for all deaf children in England, as originally accorded to hearing children'.

The National Deaf Children's Society was founded in London on 15 December 1944 by a handful of parents of deaf children concerned about the impact of the 1944 Education Act on their schooling.

2002 saw the merger of NDCS with Friends for Young Deaf People, resulting in the creation of the NDCS youth wing. The merger allows NDCS to provide a seamless service supporting families with deaf children from birth to 25.

Awards 

The National Deaf Children's Society won a British Medical Association Patient Information Award in 2017. The text of the award reads, in part:

See also 
 Audism, discrimination against Deaf and hard-of-hearing people
 National Association of the Deaf (NAD)
 IFHOHYP International Federation of Hard of Hearing Young People
 Post-lingual deafness
 Pre-lingual deafness
 Royal National Institute for Deaf People
 Youth hearing conservation programs

References

External links
 Official website
 Deaf Child Worldwide
 Treks and Challenges

Children's charities based in the United Kingdom
Deaf culture in the United Kingdom
Deafness charities
Deafness organizations
Health charities in the United Kingdom
Health in the London Borough of Islington
1944 establishments in the United Kingdom
Organisations based in the London Borough of Islington
Organizations established in 1944